William P. Murphy (July 6, 1898 – April 22, 1986) was an American jurist who served as an associate justice of the Minnesota Supreme Court from 1955 to 1972.

Early life and education 
Born in St. Cloud, Minnesota, Murphy graduated from Cathedral High School in St. Cloud, Minnesota. He then received his law degree from the St. Paul College of Law, a predecessor to the William Mitchell College of Law in Saint Paul, Minnesota.

Career 
Murphy practiced law in St. Cloud and Saint Paul, Minnesota. He then worked in the legal department of the Capitol Trust & Savings Bank in St. Paul between 1922 and 1924, and was in private practice in St. Cloud from then until 1939. In 1939, he became an assistant U.S. attorney, and from 1952 he served as regional director of the Office of Price Stabilization.

Murphy left government service in 1953 to practice with a St. Paul law firm. In 1955, Governor Orville Freeman appointed him to the Minnesota Supreme Court. Murphy left the court in 1972, and in 1975, the U.S. Securities and Exchange Commission appointed Murphy a special agent.

Personal life 
Murphy died in Hastings, Minnesota.

See also
Lefkowitz v. Great Minneapolis Surplus Store, Inc

References 

1898 births
1986 deaths
Politicians from St. Cloud, Minnesota
Justices of the Minnesota Supreme Court
William Mitchell College of Law alumni
Minnesota lawyers
20th-century American judges
20th-century American lawyers